Moku Manu, or Bird Island in the Hawaiian language, is an offshore islet of Oahu, three-quarters of a mile off Mokapu Peninsula. Moku Manu and an adjacent small islet are connected by an underwater dike. The island was formed from debris flung from a vent of the nearby Kailua Volcano. Moku Manu is protected as a state seabird sanctuary like its neighbors to the south, Manana, Kāohikaipu, and Mōkōlea Rock. Regardless, landing by boat is nearly impossible due to the lack of a safe beach.

Moku Manu's isolated nature makes it an excellent nesting site. Eleven species of seabird nest on Moku Manu, along with several species of migrating shorebird.

See also 

 Honolulu Volcanics

External links
Offshore Islets Restoration Committee

Islands of Hawaii
Geography of Honolulu County, Hawaii